Andrey Olegovich Ashmarin (born 12 February 1984) is a Russian badminton player. He became the runner-up of 2013 Russian Open in men's doubles event with his partner Vitalij Durkin.

Achievements

BWF Grand Prix 
The BWF Grand Prix had two levels, the Grand Prix and Grand Prix Gold. It was a series of badminton tournaments sanctioned by the Badminton World Federation (BWF) and played between 2007 and 2017.

Men's doubles

  BWF Grand Prix Gold tournament
  BWF Grand Prix tournament

BWF International Challenge/Series 
Men's doubles

Mixed doubles

  BWF International Challenge tournament
  BWF International Series tournament
  BWF Future Series tournament

References

External links 
 

1984 births
Living people
Badminton players from Moscow
Russian male badminton players